Makarye is a rural locality (a selo) in Novousmansky District of Voronezh Oblast, Russia, located on the Makariy River  northeast from the district's administrative center of Novaya Usman and connected to Orlovo with a  road. Population: 580 (2005 est.).

References

Notes

Sources

Rural localities in Novousmansky District